Nowa Kaletka  is a village in the administrative district of Gmina Purda, within Olsztyn County, Warmian-Masurian Voivodeship, in northern Poland. It is located within the historic region of Warmia.

The village has a population of 400.

The village was founded in 1827 after being separated from the village of Kaletka.

The village's historic sights include the pre-war Polish school building and two typical Warmian old wayside shrines.

Polish folk poet and activist  (1873–1967) was born in Nowa Kaletka.

Gallery

References

Villages in Olsztyn County